Harald Martin Bergmann Madsen (20 November 1890 – 13 July 1949) was a Danish film actor. He appeared in 51 films between 1917 and 1948. Harald Madsen was a part of the Danish comedian couple Fyrtårnet og Bivognen (Fy og Bi), known as "Long & Short" in the United Kingdom and "Ole & Axel" in the United States, alongside his partner Carl Schenstrøm (Fy).

He was born in Silkeborg, Denmark and died in Usseroed, Denmark.

Selected filmography
 Sons in Law (1926)
 Cocktails (1928)
 Alf's Carpet (1929)
 Højt paa en kvist (1929)
 I kantonnement (1932)
 Han, hun og Hamlet (1932)
 Circus Saran (1935)
 The Pale Count (1937)
 I de gode, gamle dage (1940)

References

External links
 
 
 Photographs and literature

1890 births
1949 deaths
Danish male film actors
Danish male silent film actors
20th-century Danish male actors
People from Silkeborg